Philippe Lellouche is a French actor, director, screenwriter, television presenter and singer. He was born on March 30, 1966 in Tel HaShomer in Israel. His brother is the actor Gilles Lellouche.

Biography 
After studying journalism, Philippe Lellouche joined the radio station France Inter where he presented a comedy show. He then became a reporter and worked for the French TV channel TF1 for a short period before joining the team of Envoyé spécial on France 2, where he was spotted by Marion Sarraut who offered him a role in the television series Une femme d'honneur. He followed this up with various roles, most notably in the films Michel Vaillant, produced by Luc Besson and Narco, co-directed by his brother Gilles Lellouche.

Encouraged by those close to him to go on the stage, Lellouche wrote his first one man show but it was with Le Jeu de la vérité, which he wrote and performed with his future wife, Vanessa Demouy, and the actors David Brécourt and Christian Vadim, that he achieved success. The show was well-received and led to a sequel,  Le Jeu de la vérité 2. These two shows have been performed several hundred times as well as being recorded and regularly transmitted on television. Since 2009, his third show, featuring the same cast, has played to full houses throughout France and was broadcast live on the television channel France 4 on October 14, 2011.

In February 2010, Lellouche appeared on Paris Première's Cactus talk show alongside Christine Boutin and Robert Ménard, discussing the showing of the short film Le Baiser de la Lune in primary schools. He declared himself sceptical about this anti-homophobia initiative, which he felt to be poorly targeted.

In July 2011, Lellouche directed the film Nos plus belles vacances in Brittany, working with his three usual collaborators as well a cast featuring other friends like Gérard Darmon et Julie Gayet. He was invited by the guitarist Jean-Félix Lalanne to sing Quand j'étais chanteur on his album Une voix, une guitare. Since March 2015, he has co-presented the French version of Top Gear on RMC Découverte with the former Le Mans racing driver Bruce Jouanny and Yann Larret-Menezo, also known as "Le Tone", former editor-in-chief of the magazine Intersection.

Private life 
He is the brother of the French actor Gilles Lellouche. Since the Summer of 2001, he has lived with Vanessa Demouy, with whom he has a son, Solal, born on May 17, 2003. The couple married on June 26, 2010 in the park of the Château de la Garenne de Launay near Douchy (Loiret). Their daughter Sharlie was born on May 5, 2011.

Filmography 
 As an actor
 1997: Une femme d'honneur (episode 1-02, "Pirates de la Route") (TV)
 1999: Jacotte (TV)
 2000: Docteur Sylvestre (TV)
 2000: Lise et André by Denis Dercourt
 2001: Boomer by Karim Adda
 2003: Michel Vaillant by Louis-Pascal Couvelaire
 2004: Narco by Tristan Aurouet and Gilles Lellouche
 2006: Famille d'accueil (TV)
 2008: Parking réservé by Philippe Lellouche, short film in support of CRIPS
 2010: Camping 2 by Fabien Onteniente
 2011: Mineurs 27 by Tristan Aurouet
 2011: Bienvenue à bord by Éric Lavaine : William
 2012: Nos plus belles vacances by Philippe Lellouche 
 2014: Le Jeu de la vérité by François Desagnat
 2014: Tu veux ou tu veux pas by Tonie Marshall
 Since 2015: Clem (TV series) : Xavier Ferran
 2016: Le Monde de Dory by Andrew Stanton : French voice of Hank the Octopus
 2016: Camping 3 by Fabien Onteniente
 2017: Chacun sa vie by Claude Lelouch
 As director
 1995: Poker co-written with Cédric Brenner, with Martin Lamotte 
 2008: Parking réservé, with Bruno Putzulu and Vanessa Demouy
 2012: Nos plus belles vacances, with Gérard Darmon and Julie Gayet
 2013: Un prince (presque) charmant, with Vincent Pérez, Vahina Giocante

Television 
 Since 2015: Top Gear France
 Since 2015: Clem

Theatre 
 Writer
 2004: One Man Show à trois 
 2005: Le Jeu de la vérité
 2006: Le Jeu de la vérité 2 and the film adaptation
 2007: J'en ai marre d'être juif, j'ai envie d'arrêter, Le Cherche midi
 2009: Boire, fumer et conduire vite
 2014: L'Appel de Londres, directed by Marion Sarraut
 2016: Tout à refaire
 Actor
 2004: One man show à trois by Philippe Lellouche and Laurent Spielvogel, with Les Demi-Frères
 2005/2006: Le Jeu de la vérité by Philippe Lellouche, directed by  Marion Sarraut
 2007: Le Jeu de la vérité 2 by Philippe Lellouche
 2008: Le Jeu de la vérité 2 by Philippe Lellouche, directed by Philippe Lellouche and Morgan Spillemaecker, Théâtre des Mathurins
 2009: Le siècle sera féminin ou ne sera pas by Dominique Coubes and Nathalie Vierne
 2009: Boire, fumer et conduire vite by Philippe Lellouche, directed by Marion Sarraut and Agathe Cémin
 2010: Boire, fumer et conduire vite by Philippe Lellouche, directed by Marion Sarraut, Théâtre de la Renaissance
 2014: L'Appel de Londres by Philippe Lellouche, directed by Marion Sarraut
 2015: Vous êtes mon sujet by Didier Van Cauwelaert, directed by Alain Sachs, Théâtre de La Garenne Colombes, broadcast on France 2 on February 17
 2016: Tout à refaire by Philippe Lellouche, directed by Gérard Darmon, Théâtre de la Madeleine
 Director
 2006: Jour de neige by Elsa Valensi and Élisabeth Bost
 2007: Le Jeu de la vérité by Philippe Lellouche, co-directed with Morgan Spielmacker
 2008: Le Jeu de la vérité 2 by Philippe Lellouche, co-directed with Morgan Spillemaecker, Théâtre des Mathurins
 2008: Double jeu by and with Jean-Félix Lalanne

References

External links 
 
 Unofficial Phillippe Lellouche site

1966 births
Living people
French male actors
French television presenters
21st-century French dramatists and playwrights
French theatre directors
French film directors